The  was held on 4 February 1996 in Kannai Hall, Yokohama, Kanagawa, Japan.

Awards
 Best Film: Love Letter
 Best Actor: Etsushi Toyokawa – Love Letter
 Best Actress: Miho Nakayama – Love Letter
 Best Supporting Actor: Kazuhiko Kanayama – Burai Heiya, Shin Kanashiki Hittoman
 Best Supporting Actress: Shinobu Nakayama – Gamera: Guardian of the Universe
 Best Director:
Shūsuke Kaneko – Gamera: Guardian of the Universe
Shunji Iwai – Love Letter
 Best New Director: Atsushi Muroga – Score
 Best Screenplay: Kazunori Itō – Gamera: Guardian of the Universe, Ghost in the Shell / Kōkaku Kidōtai
 Best Cinematography: Noboru Shinoda – Love Letter
 Best New Talent:
Reiko Kataoka – Ai no Shinsekai, Kamikaze Taxi
Sawa Suzuki – Gokudo no Onna-tachi: Akai Kizuna, Ai no Shinsekai, Nihon Ichi Mijikai 'Haha' e no Tegami, Teito Monogatari Gaiden
Miki Sakai – Love Letter
 Best Technical: Shinji Higuchi – Gamera: Guardian of the Universe – For his special effects.
 Special Jury Prize: Score – For the actors who played the "Score Gangs".
 Special Prize: Ikuo Sekimoto – Gokudo no Onna-tachi: Akai Kizuna – For his work.

Best 10
 Love Letter
 Gamera: Guardian of the Universe
 Ai no Shinsekai
 Kamikaze Taxi
 Gonin
 Burai Heiya
 Boxer Joe
 Tōkyō Kyōdai
 Ashita
 Score
runner-up. Endless Waltz

References

Yokohama Film Festival
Yokohama Film Festival
Yokohama Film Festival
Yoko
Yokohama Film Festival